The voiceless uvular trill is a type of consonantal sound, used in some dialects of some spoken languages. It is less common than its voiced counterpart.

Features
Features of the voiceless uvular trill:

Occurrence

See also
Index of phonetics articles
Uvular trill

Notes

References

 
 
 
 
 
 

Trill consonants
Uvular consonants
Pulmonic consonants
Voiceless oral consonants
Central consonants